Osmiini is a tribe of leafcutter, mason, and resin bees in the family Megachilidae. There are about 19 genera and at least 1,000 described species in Osmiini.

Genera
 Afroheriades Peters, 1970
 Ashmeadiella Cockerell, 1897
 Atoposmia Cockerell, 1935
 Chelostoma Latreille, 1809
 Haetosmia Popov, 1952
 Heriades Spinola, 1808
 Hofferia Tkalcu, 1984
 Hoplitis Klug, 1807
 Hoplosmia Thomson, 1872
 Noteriades Cockerell, 1931
 Ochreriades Mavromoustakis, 1956
 Osmia Panzer, 1806 (mason bees)
 Othinosmia Michener, 1943
 Protosmia Ducke, 1900
 Pseudoheriades Peters, 1970
 Stenoheriades Tkalcu, 1984
 Stenosmia Michener, 1941
 Wainia Tkalcu, 1980
 Xeroheriades Griswold, 1986

References

Further reading

 
 
 
 
 
 

Megachilidae